Prioria msoo is a species of plant in the family Fabaceae. It is found in Kenya and Tanzania.

References

Detarioideae
Flora of Kenya
Flora of Tanzania
Vulnerable plants